Baikushev's pine (also known as the Baikushev white fir, or the Baikushev fir) is a coniferous tree from the species Bosnian pine (Pinus heldreichii) situated in Pirin, southwestern Bulgaria. It is named after its discoverer, forest ranger Kostadin Baikushev, and is located near the Banderitsa refuge. With an approximate age of about 1,300 years, Baikushev's pine is one of the oldest trees in the world and is a contemporary of Bulgaria's founder, Khan Asparukh. It has a height of 26 m, is 2.2 m in diameter and 7.8m in circumference.

See also
 Granit Oak
 List of oldest trees
 List of individual trees

References

Pirin
Individual pine trees
Individual trees in Bulgaria
Pinus taxa by common names
Oldest trees